Ormetica xanthia is a moth of the family Erebidae. It was described by George Hampson in 1901. It is found in Venezuela and Mexico.

References

Ormetica
Moths described in 1901